Khirbat Qais (Arabic: خربة قيس) is a Palestinian village located in the Salfit Governorate in the northern West Bank. In 2010, it became a suburb of Salfit, about 4 km south of Salfit.

Location 
Khirbat Qais is located 4 kilometers south of Salfit. It is bordered by Salfit and Farkha to the north, Bani Zaid ash Sharqiya to the west, 'Arura village to the south, and Ammuriya village to the east.

History
Sherds from the Iron Age II/Persian, Hellenistic/Roman, Byzantine, Byzantine/Umayyad, Umayyad/Abbasid, Crusader/Ayyubid and Mamluk eras have been found here.

Ottoman era
In 1517, the village was included in the Ottoman empire with the rest of Palestine, and in the 1596 tax-records the village appeared as Hirbat Qays, located in the Nahiya of Jabal Qubal of the Liwa of Nablus.  The population was 4 households, all Muslim. The villagers paid a fixed tax rate of 33.3% on agricultural products, such as wheat, barley, goats and beehives, in addition to occasional revenues and a fixed tax for people of Nablus area; a total of 500 akçe. Sherds from the early Ottoman era have also been found here.

In 1838 it was noted as a village ‘’Khirbet Keis’’, part of the Jurat Merda district, south of Nablus.

In 1882 the PEF's Survey of Western Palestine (SWP) described Khurbet Keis as "a small village on the hillside."

British Mandate era
In the 1922 census of Palestine conducted by the British Mandate authorities, Kherbet Qais  had a population of 94 Muslims, increasing in the 1931 census to 114 Muslims in 30 occupied houses. 

In the 1945 statistics the population was 170 Muslims while the total land area was 3,388 dunams, according to an official land and population survey. Of this, 1,480 were allocated for plantations and irrigable land, 572 for cereals, while 8 dunams were classified as built-up areas.

Jordanian era
In the wake of the 1948 Arab–Israeli War, and after the 1949 Armistice Agreements, Khirbet Qeis came under Jordanian rule.

The Jordanian census of 1961 found 209 inhabitants.

Post-1967
Since the Six-Day War in 1967, Khirbet Qeis has been under Israeli occupation.

References

Bibliography

External links
Welcome To Kh. Qeis
Survey of Western Palestine, Map 14:    IAA, Wikimedia commons 
 Salfit Municipality (including Khirbet Qeis Locality) (Fact Sheet), Applied Research Institute–Jerusalem (ARIJ)
 Salfit City Profile (including Khirbet Qeis Locality), ARIJ

Towns in Salfit Governorate
Salfit Governorate
Municipalities of the State of Palestine